The Division of Bendigo is an Australian electoral division in the state of Victoria. The division was proclaimed in 1900, and was one of the original 65 divisions to be contested at the first federal election. It is named for the city of Bendigo.

The division is situated on the northern foothills of the Great Dividing Range in North Central Victoria.

The current Member for the Division of Bendigo, since the 2013 federal election, is Lisa Chesters, a member of the Australian Labor Party.

Geography
Since 1984, federal electoral division boundaries in Australia have been determined at redistributions by a redistribution committee appointed by the Australian Electoral Commission. Redistributions occur for the boundaries of divisions in a particular state, and they occur every seven years, or sooner if a state's representation entitlement changes or when divisions of a state are malapportioned.

History

In the early years of federation the seat consisted of little more than Bendigo itself, but on later boundaries the seat has included towns such as Echuca, Castlemaine, Maryborough and Seymour.

Bendigo has been a marginal seat, changing hands regularly between the Labor Party and the conservative parties; typically mirroring voting patterns in state elections. However, it has remained a Labor seat since the 1998 federal election.

Unlike most marginal seats, Bendigo is not a barometer for winning government. Since 1949, all but one of its members has spent at least one term in opposition. Indeed, during two elections that saw a change of government, it elected an opposition MP.

Its most notable members include its first representative, Sir John Quick, who was a leading federalist, and Prime Minister Billy Hughes who, although from Sydney, represented Bendigo for two terms at a time when the federal Parliament met in Melbourne, and who moved to the seat after leaving the Labor Party over conscription, holding the seat as the leader of the Nationalist Party.

John Brumby, who held the seat from 1983 to 1990, would subsequently be elected to the Victorian Legislative Council in 1993. He then transferred to the Victorian Legislative Assembly seat of Broadmeadows a few months later, after being elected Victorian Opposition Leader, a position he would hold until 1999. After serving as a senior state minister under Steve Bracks, Brumby went on to become Premier of Victoria from 2007 to 2010. 

Brumby was defeated in Bendigo at the 1990 election by a former state Legislative Councillor, Bruce Reid, who retained the seat narrowly in 1993 and 1996, before retiring at the 1998 election, when a 4.3% swing delivered the seat to Labor's Steve Gibbons. Reid has a minor claim to fame through being the third candidate in the contest for Liberal leadership between John Hewson and John Howard after the party's 1993 election defeat. Reid attracted one vote, presumably his own.

Members

Election results

References

External links
 Division of Bendigo - Australian Electoral Commission

Electoral divisions of Australia
Constituencies established in 1901
1901 establishments in Australia
Bendigo